Malwina Kopron (born 16 November 1994) is a Polish athlete specialising in the hammer throw. She won the bronze medal at the 2017 World Championships in London and at the 2020 Summer Olympics in Tokyo. In addition, she also won the bronze at the 2015 European U23 Championships.
 
Her personal best in the event is 76.85 metres set in Taipei (during the Universiade) in 2017.

Competition record

References

Polish female hammer throwers
Living people
People from Puławy
1994 births
World Athletics Championships athletes for Poland
World Athletics Championships medalists
Athletes (track and field) at the 2016 Summer Olympics
Olympic athletes of Poland
Universiade medalists in athletics (track and field)
Universiade gold medalists for Poland
Medalists at the 2019 Summer Universiade
Medalists at the 2017 Summer Universiade
Athletes (track and field) at the 2020 Summer Olympics
Medalists at the 2020 Summer Olympics
Olympic bronze medalists in athletics (track and field)
Olympic bronze medalists for Poland